Hilary Koprowski (5 December 191611 April 2013) was a Polish virologist and immunologist active in the United States who demonstrated the world's first effective live polio vaccine. He authored or co-authored over 875 scientific papers and co-edited several scientific journals.

Koprowski received many academic honors and national decorations, including the Belgian Order of the Lion, the French Order of Merit and Legion of Honour, Finland's Order of the Lion, and the Order of Merit of the Republic of Poland.

Koprowski was the target of accusations in the press related to the "oral polio vaccine AIDS hypothesis", which posited that the AIDS pandemic originated from live polio vaccines such as Koprowski's.  This allegation has long been refuted by evidence showing that the human immunodeficiency virus was introduced to humans before his polio-vaccine trials were conducted in Africa. The case was settled out of court with a formal apology from Rolling Stone magazine.

Life
Hilary Koprowski was born in Warsaw to an educated, assimilated Jewish family. His parents met in 1906 when Paweł Koprowski (1882–1957) was serving in the Imperial Russian Army, and moved to Warsaw soon after their marriage in 1912. His mother Sonia (née Berland; 1883–1967), was a dentist from Berdichev. Hilary Koprowski attended Warsaw's Mikołaj Rej Secondary School, and from age twelve he took piano lessons at the Warsaw Conservatory. He received a medical degree from Warsaw University in 1939. He also received music degrees from the Warsaw Conservatory and, in 1940, from the Santa Cecilia Conservatory in Rome. He adopted scientific research as his life's work, but never gave up music and composed several musical works. In July 1938, while in medical school, Koprowski married Irena Grasberg.

In 1939, after Germany's invasion of Poland, Koprowski and his wife, likewise a physician, fled the country, using Koprowski family business connections in Manchester, England. Hilary went to Rome, where he spent a year studying piano at the Santa Cecilia Conservatory; while Irena went to France, where she gave birth to their first child, Claude Koprowski, and worked as an attending physician at a psychiatric hospital.

As the invasion of France loomed in 1940, Irena and the infant escaped from France via Spain and Portugal —where the Koprowski family reunited — to Brazil, where Koprowski worked in Rio de Janeiro for the Rockefeller Foundation. His field of research for several years was finding a live-virus vaccine against yellow fever. After World War II the Koprowskis settled in Pearl River, New York, where Hilary was hired as a researcher for Lederle Laboratories, the pharmaceutical division of American Cyanamid. Here he began his polio experiments, which ultimately led to the creation of the first oral polio vaccine. Koprowski served as director of the Wistar Institute, 1957–91, during which period Wistar achieved international recognition for its vaccine research and became a National Cancer Institute Cancer Center.

Koprowski died on April 11, 2013, aged 96, in Wynnewood, near Philadelphia, Pennsylvania, of pneumonia. He and his wife are buried at West Laurel Hill Cemetery, Southlawn Section, Lot 782, Bala Cynwyd, Pennsylvania.

Hilary Koprowski and his late wife had two sons. Their first child Claude (born in Paris, 1940), who died in 2020, was a retired physician. Their second son, Christopher (born 1951) is a retired physician certified in two specialties, neurology and radio-oncology. He is also the former chair of the department of radiation oncology at Christiana Hospital in Delaware.

Polio vaccine
While at Lederle Laboratories, Koprowski created an early polio vaccine, based on an orally administered attenuated polio virus. In researching a potential polio vaccine, he had focused on live viruses that were attenuated (rendered non-virulent) rather than on killed viruses (the latter became the basis for the injected vaccine subsequently developed by Jonas Salk).

Koprowski viewed the live vaccine as more powerful, since it entered the intestinal tract directly and could provide lifelong immunity, whereas the Salk vaccine required booster shots. Also, administering a vaccine by mouth is easy, whereas an injection requires medical facilities and is more expensive.

Koprowski developed his polio vaccine by attenuating the virus in brain cells of a cotton rat, Sigmodon hispidus, a New World species that is susceptible to polio. He administered the vaccine to himself in January 1948 and, on 27 February 1950, to 20 children at Letchworth Village, a home for disabled persons in Rockland County, New York. Seventeen of the 20 children developed antibodies to polio virus — the other three apparently already had antibodies — and none of the children developed complications.  Within 10 years, the vaccine was being used on four continents.

Albert Sabin's early work with attenuated-live-virus polio vaccine was developed from attenuated polio virus that Sabin had received from Koprowski.

Rabies vaccine
In addition to his work on the polio vaccine, Koprowski (along with Stanley Plotkin and Tadeusz Wiktor) did significant work on an improved vaccine against rabies. The group developed the HDCV rabies vaccine in the 1960s at the Wistar Institute. It was licensed for use in the United States in 1980.

Affiliations
Koprowski was president of Biotechnology Foundation Laboratories, Inc, and head of the Center for Neurovirology at Thomas Jefferson University. In 2006 he was awarded a record 50th grant from the National Institutes of Health. He authored or co-authored over 875 scientific papers and co-edited several scientific journals. He served as a consultant to the World Health Organization and the Pan American Health Organization.

Honors and legacy
Koprowski received many honorary degrees, academic honors, and national decorations, including the Order of the Lion from the King of Belgium, the French Order of Merit for Research and Invention, a Fulbright Scholarship, and appointment as Alexander von Humboldt Professor at the Max Planck Institute for Biochemistry in Munich. In 1989 he received the San Marino Award for Medicine and the Nicolaus Copernicus Medal of the Polish Academy of Sciences in Warsaw.

Koprowski received numerous honors in Philadelphia, including the Philadelphia Cancer Research Award, the John Scott Award and, in May 1990, the most prestigious honor of his home city, the Philadelphia Award.  He was a Fellow of the College of Physicians of Philadelphia, which in 1959 presented him with its Alvarenga Prize.

Koprowski was a member of the National Academy of Sciences, the American Academy of Arts and Sciences, the New York Academy of Sciences, and the Polish Institute of Arts and Sciences of America.<ref>Directory [of] PIASA Members, p. 25.</ref> He held foreign membership in the Yugoslav Academy of Sciences and Arts, the Polish Academy of Sciences, the Russian Academy of Medical Sciences, and the Finnish Society of Sciences and Letters.

On June 3, 1983, Koprowski received an honorary doctorate from the Faculty of Medicine at Uppsala University, Sweden.

On 22 March 1995, Koprowski was made a Commander of Finland's Order of the Lion by Finland's president. On 13 March 1997 he received the Legion d'Honneur from the French government. On 29 September 1998 he was presented by Poland's president with the Grand Cross of Poland's Order of Merit.

On 25 February 2000 Koprowski was honored with a reception at Philadelphia's Thomas Jefferson University celebrating the 50th anniversary of the first administration of his oral polio vaccine. At the reception, he received commendations from the United States Senate, the Pennsylvania Senate, and Pennsylvania Governor Tom Ridge.

On 13 September 2004, Koprowski was presented with the Pioneer in NeuroVirology Award by the International Society for NeuroVirology at the 6th International Symposium on NeuroVirology held in Sardinia. On 1 May 2007, Koprowski was awarded the Albert Sabin Gold Medal by the Sabin Vaccine Institute in Baltimore, Maryland.

In 2014 Drexel University established the Hilary Koprowski Prize in Neurovirology in honor of Dr. Koprowski's contributions to the field of neurovirology. The prize is awarded annually in conjunction with the International Symposium on Molecular Medicine and Infectious Disease, which is sponsored by the Institute for Molecular Medicine and Infectious Disease (IMMID) within the Drexel University College of Medicine. During the Symposium, the prize recipient is asked to deliver an honorary lecture.

AIDS conspiracy theory

British journalist Edward Hooper publicized a hypothesis that Koprowski's research into a polio vaccine in the Belgian Congo in the late 1950s might have caused AIDS.

The OPV AIDS hypothesis has, however, been rejected within much of the medical community and is contradicted by at least one article in the journal Nature, which claims the HIV-1 group M virus originated in Africa 30 years before the OPV trials were conducted. The journal Science refuted Hooper's claims, writing: "[I]t can be stated with almost complete certainty that the large polio vaccine trial... was not the origin of AIDS."

Koprowski rejected the claim, based on his own analysis. In a separate court case, he won a regretful clarification, and a symbolic award of $1 in damages, in a defamation suit against Rolling Stone, which had published an article repeating similar false allegations. A concurrent defamation lawsuit that Koprowski brought against the Associated Press was settled several years later; the settlement's terms were not publicly disclosed.

Koprowski's original reports from 1960 to 1961 detailing part of his vaccination campaign in the Belgian Congo are available online from the World Health Organization.Plotkin SA, LeBrun A, Koprowski H (1960) "Vaccination with the CHAT strain of type 1 attenuated poliomyelitis virus in Leopoldville. Belgian Congo 2. Studies of the safety and efficacy of vaccination", Bull World Health Organ 22:215-34 online 

See also
Albert Sabin
Discredited HIV/AIDS origins theories
Jonas Salk
List of Polish people
Poles
Polio vaccine
Wistar Institute

Notes

References
 Roger Vaughan, Listen to the Music: The Life of Hilary Koprowski, Berlin, Springer, 2000; 
David Oshinsky, Polio: An American Story, Oxford University Press, 2005; 
2007 Albert B. Sabin Gold Medal awarded to Hilary Koprowski (booklet/PDF file); accessed 21 April 2015.
 Directory [of] PIASA Members, 1999'', New York City, Polish Institute of Arts and Sciences of America, 1999.

External links

Hilary Koprowski (2012), Polio Vaccine. Official site. Internet Archive.
Stacey Burling (April 14, 2013), "Hilary Koprowski, polio vaccine pioneer, dead at 96".  Philly.com, Internet Archive.
 New York Times Obituary (April 21, 2013), "Hilary Koprowski dies at 96."

Accademia Nazionale di Santa Cecilia alumni
American immunologists
American medical researchers
American people of Polish-Jewish descent
American virologists
Chopin University of Music alumni
Commanders of the Order of the Lion of Finland
Deaths from pneumonia in Pennsylvania
Grand Crosses of the Order of Merit of the Republic of Poland
Members of the Polish Academy of Sciences
Members of the United States National Academy of Sciences
Polio
Polish emigrants to the United States
Polish immunologists
Recipients of the Legion of Honour
Rockefeller Foundation people
University of Warsaw alumni
Vaccinologists
1916 births
2013 deaths
Fulbright alumni